CSS Alabama was a screw sloop-of-war built in 1862 for the Confederate States Navy at Birkenhead on the River Mersey opposite Liverpool, England by John Laird Sons and Company. Alabama served as a successful commerce raider, attacking Union merchant and naval ships over the course of her two-year career, during which she never docked at a Southern port.

History

Construction
Alabama was built in secrecy in 1862 by British shipbuilders John Laird Sons and Company, in north west England at their shipyards at Birkenhead, Wirral, opposite Liverpool. The construction was arranged by the Confederate agent Commander James Bulloch, who led the procurement of sorely needed ships for the fledgling Confederate States Navy. The contract was arranged through the Fraser Trenholm Company, a cotton broker in Liverpool with ties to the Confederacy. Under prevailing British neutrality law, it was possible to build a ship designed as an armed vessel, provided that it was not actually armed until after it was in international waters. In light of this loophole, Alabama was built with reinforced decks for cannon emplacements, ammunition magazines below water-level, etc., but the builder stopped short of fitting her out with armaments or any "warlike equipment".

Initially known only by her shipyard number "ship number 0290", she was launched as Enrica on 15 May 1862 and secretly slipped out of Birkenhead on 29 July 1862. Agent Bulloch arranged for a civilian crew and captain to sail Enrica to Terceira Island in the Azores. With Bulloch at his side, the new ship's captain, Raphael Semmes, left Liverpool on 13 August 1862 aboard the steamer Bahama to take command of the new cruiser. Semmes arrived at Terceira Island on 20 August 1862 and began overseeing the refitting of the new vessel with various provisions, including armaments, and 350 tons of coal, brought there by Agrippina, his new ship's supply vessel. After three days of back-breaking work by the three ships' crews, Enrica was equipped as a naval cruiser, designated a commerce raider, for the Confederate States of America. Following her commissioning as CSS Alabama, Bulloch then returned to Liverpool to continue his secret work for the Confederate Navy.

Alabamas British-made ordnance consisted of six muzzle-loading, broadside, 32-pounder naval smoothbores (three firing to port and three firing to starboard) and two larger and more powerful pivot cannons. The pivot cannons were placed fore and aft of the main mast and positioned roughly amidships along the deck's center line. From those positions, they could be rotated to fire across the port or starboard sides of the cruiser. The fore pivot cannon was a heavy, long-range 100-pounder, 7-inch bore (178 mm) Blakely rifled muzzle-loader; the aft pivot cannon a large, 8-inch (203 mm) smoothbore.

The new Confederate cruiser was powered by both sail and by a two-cylinder John Laird Sons and Company  horizontal steam engine, driving a single, Griffiths-type, twin-bladed brass screw. (Note: At the time a cylinder was also called an engine. Therefore, the machinery involved, which had two cylinders, could also be referred to as a pair of engines as often found in literature.)

It was possible to raise (or lower) the telescopic funnel by means of chains. This in order to be able to disguise the fact it was a steamer.

With the screw retracted using the stern's brass lifting gear mechanism, Alabama could make up to ten knots under sail alone and  when her sail and steam power were used together.

Commissioning and voyage

The ship was purposely commissioned about a mile off Terceira Island in international waters on 24 August 1862. All the men from Agrippina and Bahama had been transferred to the quarter deck of Enrica, where her 24 officers, some of them Southerners, stood in full dress uniform. Captain Raphael Semmes mounted a gun-carriage and read his commission from President Jefferson Davis, authorizing him to take command of the new cruiser. Upon completion of the reading, musicians that assembled from among the three ships' crews began to play the tune "Dixie" just as the quartermaster finished hauling down Enricas British colors. A signal cannon boomed and the stops to the halliards at the peaks of the mizzen gaff and mainmast were broken and the ship's new battle ensign and commissioning pennant floated free on the breeze. With that the cruiser became Confederate States Steamer Alabama. The ship's motto: Aide-toi et Dieu t'aidera (French for "God helps those who help themselves") was engraved in the bronze of the great double ship's wheel.

Captain Semmes then made a speech about the Southern cause to the assembled seamen (few of whom were American), asking them to sign on for a voyage of unknown length and destiny. Semmes had only his 24 officers and no crew to man his new command. When this did not succeed, Semmes changed his tack. He offered signing money and double wages, paid in gold, and additional prize money to be paid by the Confederate congress for all destroyed Union ships. When the men began to shout "Hear! Hear!" Semmes knew he had closed the deal: 83 seamen, many of them British, signed on for service in the Confederate Navy. Confederate agent Bulloch and the remaining seamen then returned to their respective ships for their return voyage to England. Semmes still needed another 20 or so men for a full crew complement, but enough had signed on to at least handle the new commerce raider. The rest would be recruited from among captured crews of raided ships or from friendly ports-of-call. Of the original 83 crewmen that signed on that day, many completed the full voyage.

Under Captain Semmes, Alabama spent her first two months in the Eastern Atlantic, ranging southwest of the Azores and then redoubling east, capturing and burning northern merchant ships. After a difficult Atlantic crossing, she then continued her path of destruction and devastation in the greater New England region. She then sailed south, arriving in the West Indies where she raised more havoc before finally cruising west into the Gulf of Mexico. There, in January 1863, Alabama had her first military engagement. She came upon and quickly sank the Union side-wheeler  just off the Texas coast, near Galveston, capturing that warship's crew. She then continued further south, eventually crossing the Equator, where she took the most prizes of her raiding career while cruising off the coast of Brazil.

After a second, easterly Atlantic crossing, Alabama sailed down the southwestern African coast where she continued her war against northern commerce. After stopping in Saldanha Bay on 29 July 1863 in order to verify that no enemy ships were in Table Bay, she finally made a much-needed refitting and reprovisioning visit to Cape Town, South Africa. Alabama is the subject of an Afrikaans folk song, "Daar kom die Alibama" still popular in South Africa today. She then sailed for the East Indies, where she spent six months destroying seven more ships before finally redoubling the Cape of Good Hope en route to France. Union warships hunted frequently for the elusive and by now famous Confederate raider, but the few times Alabama was spotted, she quickly outwitted her pursuers and vanished over the horizon.

All together, she burned 65 Union vessels of various types, most of them merchant ships. During all of Alabamas raiding ventures, captured ships' crews and passengers were never harmed, only detained until they could be placed aboard a neutral ship or placed ashore in a friendly or neutral port.

Expeditionary raids

All together, Alabama conducted a total of seven expeditionary raids, spanning the globe, before heading to France for refit and repairs:

 CSS Alabamas Eastern Atlantic Expeditionary Raid (August–September 1862) commenced immediately after she was commissioned. She immediately set sail for the shipping lanes southwest and then east of the Azores, where she captured and burned ten prizes, mostly whalers.
 CSS Alabamas New England Expeditionary Raid (October–November 1862) began after Captain Semmes and his crew departed for the northeastern seaboard of North America, along Newfoundland and New England, where she ranged as far south as Bermuda and the coast of Virginia, burning ten prizes while capturing and releasing three others.
 CSS Alabamas Gulf of Mexico Expeditionary Raid (December 1862 – January 1863) began as Alabama effected a needed rendezvous with her supply vessel, CSS Agrippina. Afterward, she rendered aid to Confederate land forces during the Battle of Galveston in coastal Texas, during which she quickly sank the Union side-wheeler .
 CSS Alabamas South Atlantic Expeditionary Raid (February–July 1863) was her most successful raiding venture, taking 29 prizes while raiding off the coast of Brazil.
 CSS Alabamas South African Expeditionary Raid (August–September 1863) occurred primarily while ranging off the coast of South Africa, as she worked together with CSS Tuscaloosa.
 CSS Alabamas Indian Ocean Expeditionary Raid (September–November 1863) was composed of a nearly 4,500 mile journey across the Indian Ocean. Successfully evading the Union gunboat Wyoming she took three prizes near the Sunda Strait and the Java Sea.
 CSS Alabamas South Pacific Expeditionary Raid (December 1863) was her final raiding venture. She took a few prizes in the Strait of Malacca before finally turning back toward France for a much needed refit and long overdue repairs.

Upon the completion of her seven expeditionary raids, Alabama had been at sea for 534 days out of 657, never visiting a single Confederate port. She boarded nearly 450 vessels, captured or burned 65 Union merchant ships, and took more than 2,000 prisoners without a single loss of life from either prisoners or her own crew.

Final cruise

On 11 June 1864, Alabama arrived in port at Cherbourg, France. Captain Semmes soon requested permission to dry dock and overhaul his ship, much needed after so long a time at sea and so many naval actions. Pursuing the raider, the American sloop-of-war, under the command of Captain John Ancrum Winslow, arrived three days later and took up station just outside the harbor. While at his previous port-of-call, Winslow had telegraphed Gibraltar to send the old sloop-of-war  with provisions and to provide blockading assistance. Kearsarge now had Alabama boxed in with no place left to run.

Having no desire to see his worn-out ship rot away at a French dock while quarantined by Union warships and given his instinctive aggressiveness and a long-held desire once again to engage his enemy, Captain Semmes chose to fight. After preparing his ship and drilling the crew for the coming battle during the next several days, Semmes issued, through diplomatic channels, a bold challenge (or hoped-for intimidation) to the Kearsarges commander, "my intention is to fight the Kearsarge as soon as I can make the necessary arrangements. I hope these will not detain me more than until to-morrow or the morrow morning at farthest. I beg she will not depart until I am ready to go out. I have the honor to be Your obedient servant, R. Semmes, Captain."

On 19 June, Alabama sailed out to meet the Union cruiser. Jurist Tom Bingham later wrote, "The ensuing battle was witnessed by Manet, who went out to paint it, and the owner of an English yacht who had offered his children a choice between watching the battle and going to church."

As Kearsarge turned to meet her opponent, Alabama opened fire. Kearsarge waited patiently until the range had closed to less than 1,000 yards (900 m). According to survivors, the two ships steamed on opposite courses in seven spiraling circles, moving southwesterly with the 3-knot current, each commander trying to cross the bow of his opponent to deliver a heavy raking fire (to "cross the T"). The battle quickly turned against Alabama due to the superior gunnery displayed by Kearsarge and the deteriorated state of Alabamas contaminated powder and fuses. Her most telling shot, fired from the forward 7-inch (178 mm) Blakely pivot rifle, hit very near Kearsarges vulnerable stern post, the impact binding the ship's rudder badly. That rifled shell, however, failed to explode. If it had done so, it would have seriously disabled Kearsarges steering, possibly sinking the warship, and ending the contest. In addition, Alabamas too rapid rate-of-fire resulted in frequent poor gunnery, with many of her shots going too high, and as a result Kearsarge benefited little that day from the protection of her outboard chain armor. Semmes later said that the armor on Kearsarge was unknown to him at the time of his decision to issue the challenge to fight, and in the years that followed Semmes steadfastly claimed he would have never fought Kearsarge if he had known she was armor-clad.

Kearsarge's hull armor had been installed in just three days, more than a year before, while she was in port at the Azores. It was stopped up and down to eye-bolts with marlines and secured by iron dogs. Her chain armor was concealed behind 1-inch deal-boards painted black to match the upper hull's color. This "chaincladding" was placed along Kearsarges port and starboard midsection down to the waterline, for additional protection of her engine and boilers when the upper portion of her coal bunkers were empty (coal bunkers played an important part in the protection of early steam vessels, such as protected cruisers).

A hit to her engine or boilers could easily leave Kearsarge dead in the water and vulnerable, or even cause a boiler explosion or fire that could destroy the cruiser. Her armor belt was hit twice during the fight: First in the starboard gangway by one of Alabamas 32-pounder shells that cut the chain armor, denting the hull planking underneath, then again by a second 32-pounder shell that exploded and broke a link of the chain armor, tearing away a portion of the deal-board covering. Had those rounds come from Alabamas more powerful 100-pounder Blakely pivot rifle, they would have easily penetrated, but the likely result would not have been very serious, as both shots struck the hull a little more than five feet above the waterline. Even if both shots had penetrated Kearsarges side, they would have completely missed her vital machinery. However, a 100-pound shell could have done a great deal of damage to her interior and nearby crewmen; hot fragments could have easily set fire to the cruiser, one of the greatest risks aboard a wooden vessel.
 
A little more than an hour after the first shot was fired, Alabama was reduced to a sinking wreck by Kearsarges powerful  Dahlgrens, forcing Captain Semmes to strike his colors and to send one of his two surviving boats to Kearsarge to ask for assistance.

According to witnesses, Alabama fired 370 rounds at her adversary, averaging one round per minute per gun, a very fast rate of fire, while Kearsarges gun crews fired less than half that number, taking more careful aim. During the confusion of battle, five more rounds were fired at Alabama after her colors were struck. (Her gun ports had been left open and the broadside cannon were still run out, appearing to come to bear on Kearsarge.) Then a hand-held white flag came fluttering from Alabamas stern spanker boom, finally halting the engagement.

Prior to this, she had her steering gear compromised by shell hits, but the fatal shot came later when one of Kearsarges  shells tore open a midsection of Alabamas starboard waterline. Water quickly rushed through the defeated cruiser, eventually drowning her boilers and forcing her down by the stern to the bottom. As Alabama sank, the injured Semmes threw his sword into the sea, depriving Kearsarges commander Captain John Ancrum Winslow of the traditional surrender ceremony of having it handed over to him as victor (an act which was seen as dishonorable by many at the time).

Of her 170 crew, the Alabama had 19 fatalities (9 killed and 10 drowned) and 21 wounded Kearsarge rescued the majority of the survivors, but 41 of Alabamas officers and crew, including Semmes, were rescued by John Lancaster's private British steam yacht Deerhound, while Kearsarge stood off to recover her rescue boats as Alabama sank. Captain Winslow was forced to stand by helplessly and watch Deerhound spirit away to England his much sought-after adversary, Captain Semmes, and his surviving shipmates. Semmes and all forty-one members of the Alabama's crew who boarded the Greyhound successfully made it to England. Semmes eventually returned to the Confederacy and became a Confederate admiral in the last weeks of the war.

The sinking of Alabama by Kearsarge is honored by the United States Navy with a battle star on the Civil War campaign streamer.

Officers

  Died in Saldanha Bay from accidental gunshot on 3 August 1863.
  Drowned in the sinking of the Alabama 19 June 1864.
  Lt of CS Marines. Brother-in-law of CS President Jefferson Davis
  Drowned in the sinking of the Alabama 19 June 1864.
  Killed in action in the sinking of the Alabama 19 June 1864

Perhaps the most courageous and selfless act during Alabama's last moments involved the ship's assistant surgeon, Dr. David Herbert Llewellyn. Dr. Llewellyn, a Briton, was much loved and respected by the entire crew. During the battle, he steadfastly remained at his post in the wardroom tending the wounded until the order to abandon ship was finally given. As he helped wounded men into Alabamas only two functional lifeboats, an able bodied sailor attempted to enter one, which was already full. Llewellyn, understanding that the man risked capsizing the craft, grabbed and pulled him back, saying "See, I want to save my life as much as you do; but let the wounded men be saved first."

An officer in the boat, seeing that Llewellyn was about to be left aboard the stricken Alabama, shouted "Doctor, we can make room for you." Llewellyn shook his head and replied, "I will not peril the wounded." Unknown to the crew, Llewellyn had never learned to swim, and he drowned when the ship went down.

His sacrifice did not go unrecognized in England. In his native village, a memorial window and tablet were placed at Easton Royal Church. Another tablet was placed in Charing Cross Hospital, London, where he attended medical school.

Repercussions

During her two-year career as a commerce raider, Alabama damaged Union merchant shipping around the world. The Confederate cruiser claimed 65 prizes valued at nearly $6,000,000 (about $ in today's dollars); in 1862 alone 28 were claimed. In an important development in international law, the U.S. government pursued the "Alabama Claims" against Great Britain for the losses caused by Alabama and other raiders fitted out in Britain. A joint arbitration commission awarded the U.S. $15.5 million in damages.

Ironically, in 1851, a decade before the Civil War, Captain Semmes had observed:

However, she and other raiders failed in their primary purpose, which was to draw Union vessels away from the blockade of the southern coastline, which was slowly strangling the Confederacy. The Confederate government had hoped that the panic of the shipping companies would force the Union to dispatch ships to protect merchant shipping and hunt down the raiders, a task which always requires a proportionately greater force when compared with the numbers of ships attacking (see Battle of the Atlantic). Union officials proved immovable on the blockade, however, and although insurance prices soared, shipping costs went up, and many vessels transferred to a neutral flag, very few naval vessels were taken off the southern blockade. In fact, with clever utilization of resources and a mammoth shipbuilding program, the Union managed to steadily increase the blockade throughout the war. It also sent vessels to protect merchant shipping and to hunt down and destroy the few Confederate raiders and privateers still operating.

The wreck
Captain Max Guerout later confirmed the wreck to be Alabamas remains.

In 1988 a non-profit organization, the CSS Alabama Association, was founded to conduct scientific exploration of the shipwreck. Although the wreck is in French territorial waters, the United States Government, as the successor to the former Confederate States of America, is the owner. On 3 October 1989 the US and France signed an agreement recognizing this wreck as an important heritage resource of both nations and establishing a Joint French-American Scientific Committee for archaeological exploration. This agreement established a precedent for international cooperation in archaeological research and in the protection of a unique historic shipwreck.

The Association CSS Alabama and the Naval History and Heritage Command signed on 23 March 1995 an official agreement accrediting Association CSS Alabama as operator of the archaeological investigation of the remains of the ship. The association, which is funded solely from private donations, is continuing to make this an international project through its fundraising in France and in the US, thanks to its sister organization, the CSS Alabama Association, incorporated in the State of Delaware.

Alabama was fitted with eight pieces of ordnance after she arrived at the Azores; six of those were 32-pounder smooth bores. Seven cannon were identified at the wreck site: Two were cast from a British Royal Navy pattern and three were of a later pattern produced by Fawcett, Preston, and Company in Liverpool.

One of the Blakely pattern 32-pounders was found lying across the starboard side of the hull, forward of the boilers. A second Blakely 32-pounder was identified outside the hull structure, immediately forward of the propeller and its lifting frame; the forward 32-pounder was recovered in 2000. Both of the British Royal Navy pattern 32-pounders were identified: One lies inside the starboard hull, forward of the boilers, adjacent to the forward Downton pump. The second was identified as lying on the iron deck structure, immediately aft of the smoke pipe; it was recovered in 2001. The sole remaining 32-pounder has not been positively identified, but it could be underneath hull debris forward of the starboard Trotman anchor.

Alabamas heavy ordnance were one Blakely Patent 7-inch 100-pounder shell rifle mounted on a pivot carriage forward and one 68-pounder smoothbore similarly mounted aft. The Blakely 7-inch 100-pounder was found beside its pivot carriage, atop the forward starboard boiler; this was the first cannon recovered from Alabama. The 68-pounder smoothbore was located aft, at the stern, immediately outside the starboard hull structure; it is possible that the remains of its truck and pivot carriage lie underneath the gun barrel. Both heavy cannon were recovered in 1994.

In addition to the seven cannon, the wreck site contained shot, gun truck wheels, and brass tracks for the gun carriages; many of the brass tracks were recovered. Two shot were recovered, and one conical projectile was inside the barrel of the 7-inch Blakely rifle. A shell for a 32-pounder was recovered from the stern, forward of the propeller; that shot was attached to a wood sabot having been packed in a wood box for storage. Additional round shot were observed scattered forward of the boilers and in the vicinity of the aft pivot gun, one possibly having been fired from Kearsarge.

In 2002, a diving expedition raised the ship's bell along with more than 300 other artifacts, including more cannons, structural samples, tableware, ornate commodes, and numerous other items that reveal much about life aboard the Confederate warship. Many of the artifacts are now housed in the Underwater Archaeology Branch, Naval History & Heritage Command conservation lab.

Folklore and heritage

Alabama is the subject of a sea shanty, Roll, Alabama, Roll which was also the basis of a 2014 record of the same name by British contemporary folk band Bellowhead.

Alabamas visit to Cape Town in 1863 has passed (with a slight spelling change) into South African folklore in the Afrikaans song, Daar Kom die Alibama.

The Alabama Hills in Inyo County, California, are named after the vessel.

Claimed Links between the CSS Alabama and Captain Nemo’s fictional submarine the Nautilus

In 1998 the Jules Verne scholar William Butcher was the first to identify a possible link between the Birkenhead built Alabama and Captain Nemo’s Nautilus from the Jules Verne 1869 novel Twenty Thousand Leagues Under the Seas. Butcher stated The Alabama, which claimed to have sunk 75 merchantmen, was destroyed by the Unionist Kearsarge off Cherbourg on 11th June 1864…. This battle has clear connections with Nemo’s final attack, also in the English Channel.

Jules Verne had himself made a previous comparison between the Birkenhead built CSS Alabama and the Nautilus in a letter to his publisher Jules Hetzel in March 1869.

In September 2021 the Birkenhead born geography teacher John Lamb noted that both the hull of the fictional Nautilus and the hull of the real-life Confederate warship CSS Alabama had both been built in secret at the Laird's shipyard in Birkenhead, lying opposite the port of Liverpool. Furthermore, both vessels had been completed on a ‘desert island’ - in the case of the Alabama on the Azores Island of Terceira

In Jules Verne's Twenty Thousand Leagues Under the Seas (1869) Captain Nemo explains how he built the Nautilus… Each of its components, Dr Arronax, was sent to me from a different point on the globe via a forwarding address. ….  the iron plates for its hull by Laird’s of Liverpool…. I set up my workshops on a small desert island in the middle of the ocean. There with my workmen, that is my good companions whom I instructed and trained, I completed our Nautilus.

According to the historian Stephen Fox, Captain Raphael Semmes had portraits of General Robert E Lee and the Confederate President Jefferson Davis on the cabin wall of the CSS Alabama. In Jules Verne’s Twenty Thousand Leagues Under the Seas, Captain Nemo has portraits of Abraham Lincoln and the radical abolitionist John Brown adorning the cabin walls of the Nautilus. Raphael Semmes was a supporter of slavery while Captain Nemo is a militant antislaver.

The two-year voyage of the CSS Alabama had covered a distance of approximately 75,000 miles which equates to just over 21,700 leagues and Jules Verne may have chosen Captain Nemo’s motto of ‘Mobilis in Mobile’ quite simply because the captain of the CSS Alabama – Raphael Semmes, was a resident of Mobile, Alabama.

In 1869 Captain Raphael Semmes released his American Civil War memoirs entitled Memoirs of Service Afloat During the War Between the States. In the same year of 1869, Jules Verne released his classic novel Twenty Thousand leagues Under the Seas John Lamb catalogued the many similarities between the two books on his website Jules Verne and the Heroes of Birkenhead in August 2022.

John Lamb hypothesized that to Jules Verne the CSS Alabama and Captain Nemo's Nautilus might essentially be one and the same and that the militant abolitionist Captain Nemo is the ‘alter ego’ of the pro slavery Raphael Semmes - i.e. the ‘opposite of oneself’https://julesverneandtheheroesofbirkenhead.co.uk/wp-content/uploads/2022/07/25.-Revealing-Captain-Nemo-Jules-Verne-in-Conversation-with-Raphael-Semmes.-2.pdf 

In the sequel novel to Twenty Thousand Leagues Under the Sea entitled The Mysterious Island Captain Nemo returns and is revealed as the rebel Indian Prince Dakkar a possible derivation of the Afrikaan song Daar Kom die Alibama (see above) whereby moving the letter 'k' two spaces to the left gives the phrase Dakar om die Alibama.

In November 2021, Alan Evans the Director of Regeneration and Place at Wirral Borough Council endorsed the further claim by John Lamb that Jules Verne had set his 1874 novel The Mysterious Island in Birkenhead and the surrounding Wirral Peninsula, so marking the return of the Birkenhead built Nautilus and Captain Nemo back to their 'hometown'.

In August 2022 the British Member of Parliament for Birkenhead, Mick Whitley also endorsed John Lamb's discovery that Robert Louis Stevenson had also set his classic pirate novel Treasure Island (1881) in the town of Birkenhead and the surrounding Wirral Peninsula.

The letters of support for both novels were posted on the Jules Verne and the Heroes of Birkenhead website.

Battle ensigns and other naval flags

The practice of using primary and secondary naval flags after the British tradition was common practice for the Confederacy, linked as she was by both heritage and economy to the British Isles. The fledgling Confederate Navy therefore adopted and used jacks, commissioning pennants, battle ensigns, small boat ensigns, designating flags, and signal flags aboard its warships during the Civil War.

Surviving stars and bars

At the beginning of Alabamas raiding ventures, the newly commissioned cruiser may have been forced, out of necessity, to fly the only battle ensign available to Captain Semmes: an early 1861, 7-star First National Flag, possibly the same battle ensign flown aboard his previous command, the smaller commerce raider CSS Sumter. Between 21 May and 28 November 1861, six more Southern states seceded and joined the Confederacy. Well before Alabama was launched as Enrica at Birkenhead, Merseyside in North West England, six more white, 5-pointed stars had been added to the "Stars and Bars" far away across the Atlantic on the Confederate mainland.

One such early "Stars and Bars" battle ensign was salvaged from Alabamas floating debris, following her sinking by Kearsarge. It still survives and is held by the Alabama Department of Archives and History. It is listed there as "Auxiliary Flag of the C.S.S. Alabama, Catalogue No. 86.3766.1." According to their provenance reconstruction, DeCost Smith, an American from New England, discovered this "Stars and Bars" ensign in a Paris upholstery shop in 1884, where he purchased it for 15 francs. Smith's nephew, Clement Sawtell of Lincoln Square, Massachusetts, later inherited the ensign from his uncle. At the suggestion of retired Rear Admiral Beverly M. Coleman, Sawtell donated it to the State of Alabama on 3 June 1975.

This battle ensign's overall dimensions are different from the Confederate flag regulations' required 2:3 ratio. It is 64-inches high (hoist) by 112-inches long (fly), a proportion of 5:9, and its dark blue canton contains eight white stars, 8-inches (203 mm) high, in an unusual arrangement: The stars are not organized in a circle but configured in three, centered, horizontal rows of two, then three, and finally two. The additional 8th star is tucked into the lower left corner (and in the lower right corner on the opposite side), giving the canton's layout a unique, asymmetrical appearance. It seems plausible this was Alabamas original 7-star battle ensign, possibly flown aboard CSS Sumter as noted earlier, and later altered at some point when the long-delayed news of an 8th state joining the Confederacy finally reached the far distant cruiser.

Two "Star and Bars" battle ensigns, labeled as having belonged to Alabama, also still exist. The first is a mounted and framed, 14-star ensign located at the Mariner's Museum in Virginia. (A small number of these unusual 14-star national flags have survived to the modern era and are held in several Civil War archives.) From the several color photo available on the Internet, this ensign appears to have an approximate hoist-to-fly aspect ratio of 1:2.5 (i.e., very rectangular). A second "Stars and Bars" battle ensign is on display at the Pensacola Historical Museum. Its canton contains a circle of 12 stars surrounding a centered, larger 13th star.

Surviving stainless banners
Four of Alabamas later-style ensigns have survived to the modern era. The first measures  and is located in South Africa at Cape Town's Bo-Kaap Museum. Its Southern Cross canton is oversize and made after the British navy fashion: Instead of being square, it has a very rectangular 1:2 aspect ratio. It was also made without any white stripes outlining its diagonal blue bars. A central 5-pointed white star, located where the two blue saltieres' cross, is larger than the other twelve. This ensign appears to have been made by her British crew sometime between Alabamas two visits to Cape Town. This flown ensign was finally given in thanks to William Anderson, whose ship's chandler company helped make repairs and provide supplies to Alabama in Cape Town, shortly before the raider returned to Cherbourg, France (and her fateful battle with the sloop-of-war, USS Kearsarge).

A second Stainless Banner ensign of South African origin was made and then presented to Alabama on one of her two port visits to Cape Town; it resides in the Tennessee State Museum, according to their website.

The third surviving Stainless Banner is one of Alabamas original small boat ensigns. This official-looking  ensign is marked in brown pigment on its hoist: "Alabama. 290. C.S.N. 1st Cutter." In 2007 it was offered and sold through Philip Weiss Auctions. It was being sold by the grandson of its second owner, who had originally purchased it from the granddaughter of a USS Kearsarge sailor. Its buyer has since resold this small boat ensign through a later auction.

Because Alabama was forced to replace several of her original small boats lost at different times during her lengthy cruise, this is likely a larger replacement boat ensign. While it could have been made aboard, its somewhat more accurate details suggest it might have been commissioned ashore during a port-of-call visit. This ensign was rescued from the sinking Alabama by W. P. Brooks, the cruiser's assistant-engineer. It was last flown, along with other historic flags, during a ceremony held on the parade ground at Fort Pulaski, GA, sometime during 1937. This ensign has since been mounted and framed and continues to reside with the Brooks family; four modern photos of it can be found at the website for the "Alabama Crew," a British-based naval reenactor group.

The Alabama Department of Archives and History has in its collection one more important Stainless Banner ensign listed as "Admiral Semmes' Flag, Catalogue No. 86.1893.1 (PN10149-10150)". Their provenance reconstruction shows that it was presented to Semmes after the sinking of Alabama by "Lady Dehogton and other English ladies". Such presentations of ceremonial colors were uncommon to ships' captains of the Confederate Navy, but a few were known to have received such honors. This Second National Flag is huge and made of pure silk, giving it an elegant appearance. While this ensign is in a remarkable state of preservation, its large size and delicate condition have made its up-close details and measurements unavailable. When Semmes returned to the Confederacy from England, he brought this ceremonial Stainless Banner with him. It was inherited by his grandchildren, Raphael Semmes III and Mrs. Eunice Semmes Thorington. Following his sister's death, Raphael Semmes III donated the ensign to the state of Alabama on 19 September 1929.

See also

Irvine Bulloch – James's half-brother who was the youngest midshipman and officer on the ship
James Dunwoody Bulloch – Confederate agent and uncle of Theodore Roosevelt who covertly bought the AlabamaBlockade runners of the American Civil War
Bibliography of American Civil War naval history
List of ships captured in the 19th century
List of ships of the Confederate States Navy
""Trent Affair""

References

BibliographyThis article contains public domain material from the Naval History and Heritage Command, entry here. Barnett, Gene. "Alabama," Dictionary of American History, Volume 1, Third Edition.
Bowcock, Andrew. CSS Alabama, Anatomy of a Confederate RaiderChatham Publishing, London, 2002. .

Delaney, Norman C. "'Old Beeswax': Raphael Semmes of the Alabama." Harrisburg, PA, Vol. 12, #8, December, 1973 issue, Civil War Times Illustrated. No ISSN.
Fox, Stephen. Wolf of the Deep; Raphael Semmes and the Notorious Confederate Raider CSS Alabama. 2007, Alfred A. Knopf Publishing. .
Gindlesperger, James. Fire on the Water: The USS Kearsarge and the CSS AlabamaBurd Street Press, 2005. .
Hearn, Chester G., Gray Raiders of the Sea Louisiana State Press, 1996. .
Luraghi, Raimondo. A History of the Confederate Navy. U.S. Naval Institute Press, 1996. .
Madaus, H. Michael. Rebel Flags Afloat: A Survey of the Surviving Flags of the Confederate States Navy, Revenue Service, and Merchant MarineWinchester, MA, Flag Research Center, 1986. ISSN 0015-3370. (An 80-page special edition of "The Flag Bulletin" magazine, #115, devoted entirely to Confederate naval flags.)
Marvel, William. The Alabama & the Kearsarge: The Sailor's WarUniversity of North Carolina Press, 1996. .
Roberts, Arthur C., M. D. "Reconstructing USS Kearsarge, 1864," Silver Spring, MD., Vol. 44, #4; Vol. 45, #s 1, 2, and 3, 1999, 2000, Nautical Research Journal. ISSN 0738-7245.
Secretary of the Navy. Sinking of the Alabama — Destruction of the Alabama by the Kearsarge. Washington, D.C., Navy Yard, 1864. (Annual report in the library of the Naval Historical Center.)
Semmes, R., CSS, Commander. The Cruise of the Alabama and the Sumter,(Two Volumes In One)Carlton, Publisher, New York, 1864.
Semmes, Raphael, Admiral, CSN. Memoirs of Service Afloat During the War Between the States. Blue & Grey Press, 1987. .
 
Still Jr., William N.; Taylor, John M.; Delaney, Norman C.(1998). Raiders and Blockaders, the American Civil War AfloatBrassy's, Inc., .
Uncredited reporter. Confederate Flag Flies At Pulaski, Savannah News-Press, Savannah, GA., printed around 1937. (Depression-era newspaper article about W. P. Brooks' rescued CSS Alabama ensign being flown as part of a ceremony held on the parade ground at Fort Pulaski, GA.)
Wilson, Walter E. and Gary L. Mckay. James D. Bulloch; Secret Agent and Mastermind of the Confederate Navy. Mcfarland & Co. Inc., 2012. .
Styles, Showell "Number Two-ninety" 1966.

External links

Cruisers, Cotton and Confederates
Semmes, Raphael, The Cruise of the Alabama and the Sumter, Carleton, 1864, Digitized by Digital Scanning Incorporated, 2001, .
C.S.S. Alabama: A Virtual Exhibit, Marshall University
Edwin Maffitt Anderson photographs (University Libraries Division of Special Collections, The University of Alabama) - photo album containing cartes de visite of Raphael Semmes and crew members, as well as drawings of the ship.
“High Seas Duel” from Civil War Quarterly'' magazine, 2014. Numerous photos and first-hand accounts.

 
Ships built on the River Mersey
Cruisers of the Confederate States Navy
Shipwrecks in the English Channel
Alabama in the American Civil War
Maritime incidents in June 1864
Archaeological sites in France
Commerce raiders
1862 ships
Shipwrecks of the American Civil War
1984 archaeological discoveries